Vishal Malhotra (born 15 November 1977) is an Indian film and television actor and a show host. Malhotra was first seen hosting Disney Hour in 1995, and as a teenager in Hip Hip Hurray in 1998.  He also hosted Disney Time on Sony Entertainment Television in 2004. He is also the part of Disney channel's serial named Vicky & Vetaal, in which he plays the role of Vetaal.

He made his film debut with Ken Ghosh's Ishq Vishk and went on to act in films like Salaam-E-Ishq, Kaal, Dor, Kismat Konnection and Naqaab. He also hosted Entertainment Ke Liye Kuch Bhi Karega  which premiered in 2009 with Mona Singh. He played the role of Maaya Manther  in Kya Mast Hai Life 2. He also had a cameo in Shararat. He played the role of Dr. Ranganath, assistant administrator of Dr. Kotnis General Hospital in Sony Entertainment Television's serial Kuch Toh Log Kahenge. Besides this, he was the brand ambassador of Harpic, replacing Hussain Kuwajerwala since 2013.

Filmography

Movies

Television shows

Dubbing roles

Live action films

Animated films

References

External links

 

20th-century Indian male actors
Indian male voice actors
Living people
Male actors in Hindi cinema
Indian male television actors
Indian television presenters
1981 births
21st-century Indian male actors